Kathy M. Gannon is a Canadian journalist and news director of the Associated Press for Afghanistan and Pakistan. Gannon was attacked and wounded while reporting from Afghanistan.
Her German colleague, Anja Niedringhaus, was mortally wounded.
Gannon has received extensive coverage as she struggled to recover from her wounds and return to war reporting.Now Senior Fellow, media centre at Harvard Kenedy School.

Biography
Gannon was born in Timmins, Ontario. She has reported on Afghanistan and Pakistan since 1988. In 2002, the International Women's Media Foundation presented her with the Courage in Journalism Award.
In 2003, she was awarded a one-year Edward R. Murrow Press Fellowship from the Council on Foreign Relations.

Gannon is the author of I is for Infidel: From Holy War to Holy Terror in Afghanistan. She was the 2015 recipient of the McGill Medal for Journalistic Courage from the Henry W. Grady College of Journalism and Mass Communication.

Gannon had spent 18 years, reporting from Afghanistan prior to her attack, and was the Associated Press's regional chief.

Gannon and Niedringhaus were in a convoy of journalists, reporting on the national elections, protected by elements of the Afghan National Army and Police. When the vehicles were stopped, one of the commanders, named Naqibullah, of the police contingent took his rifle, yelled "Allahu Akbar!", and fired into their vehicle at close range. He then sat down and surrendered to his colleagues.

References

1954 births
Living people
20th-century Canadian journalists
21st-century Canadian journalists
21st-century Canadian non-fiction writers
21st-century Canadian women writers
Associated Press reporters
Canadian women journalists
Journalists from Ontario
War correspondents of the War in Afghanistan (2001–2021)
Writers from Timmins